Cashless catering is a prepay point of sale (POS) technology that allows transactions with the absence of cash at the time of purchase. It is used in canteens, particularly those in schools.  The use of the technology has expanded to include music festivals such as Ottawa Bluesfest and Wireless Festival, where the system has been integrated into RFID wristbands.

System 
Users of the system have a profile which stores information such as the account balance, personal details and a photograph for verification purposes. Cashless catering systems can use a variety of user identification methods, such as PIN entry, Fingerprint recognition, Magnetic stripe cards, Photograph recognition, Electronic fob and Smart cards

The cost to a British high school of setting up a cashless catering system was approximately £21,000 GBP in 2012; for primary schools it was £7,500.  Systems require annual maintenance at approximately £2,500 for high schools and £1,000 for primary schools.

See also 
Biometrics in schools
Electronic money

References 

Payment systems